Broxbourne is a constituency in Hertfordshire represented in the House of Commons of the UK Parliament since 2005 by Charles Walker of the Conservative Party.

Constituency profile 
Broxbourne is, measured by the winning candidate's share of the vote, the safest seat of any held by the Conservative Party in Hertfordshire, and one of the safest in the country.

Just beyond the outer limits of Greater London, the constituency consists almost exclusively of low-unemployment census output areas, with walks, golf courses and leisure facilities, and (compared to Greater London) a relatively high proportion of the retired and the high-income self-employed. Broxbourne's economy is also supported by good railway links to the City of London.

Boundaries and boundary changes

1983–1997: The Borough of Broxbourne, the District of East Hertfordshire wards of Great Amwell, Little Amwell, and Stanstead, and the District of Welwyn Hatfield ward of Northaw.

Formed as a Borough Constituency primarily from parts of the abolished County Constituency of East Hertfordshire, mainly consisting of the former Urban Districts of Cheshunt and Hoddesdon which had been combined to form the District of Broxbourne under the local government reorganisation of 1974 and also including Stanstead Abbotts and Great Amwell to the north and Northaw (transferred from Welwyn Hatfield) to the west.

1997–present: The Borough of Broxbourne, and the District of Welwyn Hatfield ward of Northaw.

The three District of East Hertfordshire wards were transferred to Hertford and Stortford.

Members of Parliament

Elections

Elections in the 2010s

Elections in the 2000s

Elections in the 1990s

Elections in the 1980s

See also
 List of parliamentary constituencies in Hertfordshire

Notes

References

External links 
nomis Constituency Profile for Broxbourne — presenting data from the ONS annual population survey and other official statistics.

Parliamentary constituencies in Hertfordshire
Constituencies of the Parliament of the United Kingdom established in 1983
Politics of the Borough of Broxbourne
Politics of Welwyn Hatfield